Amy Tryon (February 24, 1970 – April 12, 2012) was an American equestrian.

Tryon was born in Redmond, Washington.  She won a bronze medal in team eventing at the 2004 Summer Olympics in Athens, together with Kimberly Severson, John Williams, Darren Chiacchia, and Julie Richards. She also competed in individual eventing, placing sixth.

She won an individual bronze medal at the 2006 World championship in Aachen. Amy and her horse Poggio II went on to represent the US at the 2008 Olympics in Hong Kong.

Death
Tryon was found dead at her home in Duvall, Washington on April 12, 2012. According to King County Medical Examiner's Office, Tryon died of an "accidental drug overdose". The toxicology reports show toxic levels of "oxycodone, diphenhydramine, alprazolam, lorazepam, diazepam and temazepam" in her system at the time of her death.

References

External links

1970 births
2012 deaths
American female equestrians
Olympic bronze medalists for the United States in equestrian
Equestrians at the 2004 Summer Olympics
Equestrians at the 2008 Summer Olympics
Sportspeople from Redmond, Washington
Sportspeople from King County, Washington
Medalists at the 2004 Summer Olympics
21st-century American women